Players and pairs who neither have high enough rankings nor receive wild cards may participate in a qualifying tournament held one week before the annual Wimbledon Tennis Championships.

Seeds

  Viktoriya Kutuzova (qualified)
  Varvara Lepchenko (second round)
  Tatjana Malek (qualified)
  Arantxa Rus (first round)
  Mara Santangelo (first round)
  Camille Pin (first round)
  Mariana Duque Mariño (first round)
  Andrea Petkovic (second round)
  Alberta Brianti (qualified)
  Vitalia Diatchenko (second round)
  Julie Ditty (first round)
  Anastasija Sevastova (qualified)
  Evgeniya Rodina (second round)
  Klára Zakopalová (qualified)
  Melanie Oudin (qualified)
  Anna Lapushchenkova (second round)
  Polona Hercog (second round)
  Carly Gullickson (first round)
  Yvonne Meusburger (second round)
  Angelique Kerber (second round)
  Maret Ani (first round)
  Julia Schruff (qualifying competition)
  Angela Haynes (second round)
  Lenka Wienerová (first round)

Qualifiers

  Viktoriya Kutuzova
  Klára Zakopalová
  Tatjana Malek
  Aiko Nakamura
  Arantxa Parra Santonja
  Sesil Karatantcheva
  Regina Kulikova
  Melanie Oudin
  Alberta Brianti
  Neuza Silva
  Vesna Manasieva
  Anastasija Sevastova

Lucky loser
  Kristína Kučová

Qualifying draw

First qualifier

Second qualifier

Third qualifier

Fourth qualifier

Fifth qualifier

Sixth qualifier

Seventh qualifier

Eighth qualifier

Ninth qualifier

Tenth qualifier

Eleventh qualifier

Twelfth qualifier

External links

2009 Wimbledon Championships on WTAtennis.com
2009 Wimbledon Championships – Women's draws and results at the International Tennis Federation

Women's Singles Qualifying
Wimbledon Championship by year – Women's singles qualifying
Wimbledon Championships